Thomas Koon House is a historic home in Cumberland, Allegany County, Maryland, United States. It is a brick Prairie-style house of large scale built in about 1912. It features arranged rectangular blocks with large expanses of window space, a terra cotta tiled hip roof and a small similarly influenced detached garage. The house was designed by Holmboe & Lafferty of Clarksburg for Doctor Thomas W. Koon, who arrived in Cumberland setting up an "active general practice" in May 1900.

The Thomas Koon House was listed on the National Register of Historic Places in 1982.

References

External links
, including undated photo, at Maryland Historical Trust

Houses completed in 1912
Houses in Allegany County, Maryland
Buildings and structures in Cumberland, Maryland
Houses on the National Register of Historic Places in Maryland
1912 establishments in Maryland
National Register of Historic Places in Allegany County, Maryland